Hibiki is a Japanese word which can be translated as "echo" among other meanings. It may refer to:

People
, Japanese footballer 
, Japanese long jumper
Reine Hibiki, a Japanese illustrator whose work includes art for Maria-sama ga Miteru
, Japanese AV actress and an idol singer
, Japanese video artist
, Japanese racing driver
, Japanese scientist
, Japanese footballer
, Japanese stage actress and voice actress

Fictional characters
Dan Hibiki, a character in the fighting game series Street Fighter
Hibiki Amawa, a character in the anime I My Me! Strawberry Eggs
Hibiki Takane, a character in the Last Blade fighting game series
Hibiki Tokai, a character in the anime Vandread
Go Hibiki, the Japanese name for the character Speed Racer in the 1997 series
, a character in the anime series Gatchaman Crowds
Kamen Rider Hibiki, a Japanese tokusatsu superhero television series
Kamen Rider Hibiki (character), the title character of the series
Midori Hibiki, a teacher from the manga Yu-Gi-Oh! GX
Koyo Hibiki, brother of Midori Hibiki
Ran Hibiki, a character from the Rival Schools fighting game series
Ryoga Hibiki, a character in the anime Ranma ½
, a character in the anime series SSSS.Gridman
Hibiki, the title character from the manga Hibiki's Magic
Hibiki, a character from the manga Change 123
Hibiki Hojo, a character from magical girl anime Suite PreCure
Hibiki Ganaha, a character in their Life simulation game and anime The Idolmaster
Hibiki Tachibana, a character in the anime Senki Zesshō Symphogear
Hibiki of the Mizaki clan, a character in Hakkenden: eight dogs of the east
Hibiki is the Japanese name for the male protagonist of Pokémon HeartGold and SoulSilver
Hibiki Kohaku, a character in the fighting game series BlazBlue
Hibiki Kuze, the main character from the anime Devil Survivor 2: The Animation and its video game
Hibiki Amami, the main character in the series Re-kan!
Hibiki Hagyū, a main character from the anime series Anne Happy
Hibiki Lates, a background character in the anime and manga series Fairy Tail
Hibiki Otonokoji, a character from the Danganronpa fangame, Super Danganronpa Another 2.
Hibiki Sakura, the main character of the manga series How Heavy Are The Dummbells You Lift?
Hibiki, a shipgirl (destroyer) from the anime kantai collection

Other
Hibiki (whisky), a Japanese whisky
Hibiki, a warship that served in the Imperial Japanese Navy during World War II
"Hibiki", a single by Japanese boy band Kanjani Eight
Hibiki, a performance piece by the dance troupe Sankai Juku
 Dendrobium Hibiki, a grex of the orchid species Dendrobium
 Hi-Fi Rush (video game), a third-person action game released in 2023 had the codename Hibiki during development. The text "HIBIKI" can be seen on the main character's belt. Additionally, one of the abilities the player can acquire in the game is named "Hibiki!".

Japanese masculine given names
Japanese unisex given names
Japanese-language surnames